Bantry Bay is an affluent suburb of Cape Town in the Western Cape Province, South Africa, situated on the slopes of Lion's Head and overlooking a rocky coastline. Its neighboring suburbs are Sea Point and Clifton. It was originally called Botany Bay after a botanical garden that was planted here for the cultivation of medicinal herbs.  The name was changed during the First World War.

It is overlooked by Lion's Head, which is an eroded outlier of sandstone. There is a plaque on the seashore that commemorates a visit by Charles Darwin, who made important geological observations here relating to the nature and origin of granite.

Bantry Bay is known to be the most wind-free area in Cape Town. Secluded & protected, this area gets about 290 wind free days per year - a significant fact given Cape Town's windy climate.

References

Suburbs of Cape Town